Victoria Quay (VQ) (Cidhe Bhictòria in Scottish Gaelic) is a Scottish Government building situated in Leith, Edinburgh, relatively close to the HRY Brittania museum ship.

History
The building was set on redeveloped dockland and housed parts of what was then known as the Scottish Office. With the advent of parliamentary devolution in 1999, these offices became part of the then Scottish Executive, now the Scottish Government. It was intended that some 1,500 civil servants would work at Victoria Quay.

The building was designed by Robert Matthew Johnson Marshall, and there are some prominent nods to naval architecture in the design.  Its construction began in 1993, and it was officially opened by Queen Elizabeth on Monday 1 July 1996.

This building launched Leith's regeneration programme proper. New luxury flats, converted bond warehouses, bistros, bars, and restaurants followed. Until Victoria Quay opened, most of these official posts were at New St. Andrew's House (NSAH) on James Craig Walk, Jeffrey Street and Brandon Street in central Edinburgh. New St. Andrew's House (NSAH) was closed in phases from 1995 to 1996 as a result of the presence of asbestos in the building, and lay empty until demolition in 2017.

References

Government buildings in Edinburgh
Buildings and structures in Leith
Politics of Edinburgh